Golzari may refer to:
Golzari, Iran, a village in Khuzestan Province, Iran
Sam Golzari (b. 1979), British actor
Nasser Golzari, architect and academic